Maalikapurathamma is a goddess enshrined in a small temple at Sabarimala Ayyappa Temple. Maalikapurathamma Temple is visited after darshan of Sabarimala Ayyappa Temple. Malikapurathamma Temple is in front of Manimandapam. The Pandalam royal family and their associates worship Malikapurathamma as a  mother. Usually, everyone in the Pandalam royal family who visits Sabarimala stays in Malika (meaning a small palace) behind Manimandapam. Long before this deity was placed on Malika for this deity was called Malikapurathamma. Usually in Kerala, the deity named as abode (Chottanikara amma, Attukal Amma)  Ayyappan Swami grew up in Pandlam Palace at the age of 12. Ayyappan Swami worships Malikapurathamma as the goddess of  pandalam family. Maalikapurathamma is this concept of the family of the goddess Madurai Meenakshi, the goddess of the Pandalam royal family.

Offerings
Thengai Urutt (rolling of coconut) is an important ritual performed in this temple. Coconuts are offered only after rolling them on the ground. Other main offerings to Goddess Malikapurathu Amma are Thamboolam, saffron powder (Kumkumam podi), Manjal podi (turmeric powder), plantain (Kadali Pazham), Jhagri (Sharkara), red silk and honey.

Ayyappa swamy's procession Ezhunnelathu
Starting with the Makaravillaku Festival, Ayappa Swami's procession will be held for five consecutive days. For the last five days, Thidanbu (Ayyappan's golden face and mustache) will line up. This thidambu was sent by the Pandaram royal family to one of the thiruvabhrnam boxes. The first four days of the procession go from (Jeeva samadhi) to Pathinettam padi (18 steps). Here rituals called nilapadunilkkal and vettavili are performed. Vettavili is the story of Ayyappaswamy and folk tales sung in separate songs. vettavili also describes the Ayyappa Swamy matrix. After the nilapadu nilkkal procession, we will return to Manimandapam. The fifth day procession runs from Manimandapam to Sharamukti. Again, the nilapadunilkkal and vettavili rituals were performed. The four-day procession carries sharanaghosam, theevetti (traditional ceremonial fire lamps) and flag poles. However, on the fifth day, the procession returned from Sharamkuthi, without the sharanaghosam pole, evetti and flag being hoisted. This shows that Ayyappan Swami went to Sharamukti and returned with Bhoota Ganam. At the end of the festival, the flag pole was lowered and there was neither Evetti nor Shalanagosam.

See also
 Ayyappan 
 Makara Jyothi 
 Pettathullal
 Sabarimala

References

Narayana Guru
Hindu goddesses